Betim may refer to the following:

Betim, Brazilian city

Given name
Betim Aliju (born 1989), Macedonian football player
Betim Halimi (born 1996), Kosovan footballer
Betim Muço (1947–2015), Albanian writer, poet, translator, and seismologist

Other
Rafael Betim Marti (born 1987), Brazilian footballer

See also